William Paterson  is a senior career officer with the Department of Foreign Affairs and Trade. He served as the Australian Ambassador to the Republic of Korea until the end of 2016.

Early life 
Paterson was born in Ballarat, Victoria. He received a Bachelor of Arts (Honours) from the University of Melbourne.

Career 
Before taking up his position in Korea he was First Assistant Secretary, International Security Division in Canberra and Australian Ambassador for Counter-Terrorism. Prior to this, Paterson was the head of the Australian Government's Iraq Task Force and Anti-Terrorism Task Force.

Paterson has previously served as Ambassador to Thailand, Minister at the Australian Embassy in Tokyo, Counsellor at the Australian Embassy in Washington and in earlier postings to Vienna, Baghdad and Dhaka. He was also Chief of Staff to Foreign Minister Alexander Downer in 2000.

Paterson was awarded the Public Service Medal in 2004 and the Humanitarian Overseas Service Medal in 2005.

References

Year of birth missing (living people)
Living people
Ambassadors of Australia to Mongolia
Ambassadors of Australia to Thailand
Ambassadors of Australia to South Korea
Ambassadors of Australia to North Korea
University of Melbourne alumni
People from Ballarat